Laguna Caldera is a potentially active volcanic caldera  and a geographical depression in Rizal, Philippines. It is broadly elliptical in shape, with dimensions of 20 by 10 km. The caldera forms the middle lobe of Laguna de Bay, bound by the Morong Peninsula and Talim Island to the west, and the Jalajala Peninsula to the east.

The caldera may have formed in two stages about 1 million and 27,000-29,000 years ago, during which time at least two major explosive eruptions took place. It is unknown when the Laguna Caldera last erupted but it may have been active during the Holocene. Deposits from the caldera form thick ignimbrite sheets in Rizal, Metro Manila, Laguna, and Bulacan. Remnants of volcanic activity include undated maars at the southern end of Talim Island and a solfatara field on nearby Mount Sembrano. Given the current shape of the lake and the caldera, and how it was once connected to Manila Bay as evidenced by its ground drill geology, its formation is speculated to have been a result of an even earlier cataclysmic eruption, pointing to a possibility that it was once a volcano of considerable elevation that exploded, similar to Krakatoa.

Photographs

See also
List of active volcanoes in the Philippines
List of potentially active volcanoes in the Philippines
List of inactive volcanoes in the Philippines
Philippine Institute of Volcanology and Seismology
Ring of Fire

References 

Subduction volcanoes
Volcanoes of Luzon
Landforms of Laguna (province)
Calderas of the Philippines
Pleistocene calderas